Juhani Ruotsalainen (1 April 1948–2015) was a Finnish ski jumper. He competed in the normal hill and large hill events at the 1968 Winter Olympics.

References

External links
 

1948 births
2015 deaths
Finnish male ski jumpers
Olympic ski jumpers of Finland
Ski jumpers at the 1968 Winter Olympics
People from Iisalmi
Sportspeople from North Savo
20th-century Finnish people